The 2016 United States presidential election in Virginia was held on November 8, 2016, as part of the 2016 general election in which all 50 states plus the District of Columbia participated. Virginia voters chose electors to represent them in the Electoral College via a popular vote pitting the Republican Party's nominee, businessman Donald Trump, and running mate Indiana Governor Mike Pence against Democratic Party nominee, former Secretary of State Hillary Clinton and her running mate, Virginia Senator Tim Kaine.

The Democratic Party candidate, Hillary Clinton of New York, carried Virginia with a 49.73% plurality in the popular vote against businessman Donald Trump of New York, who carried 44.41%, a victory margin of 5.32%. Clinton seemed to benefit from having former Virginia governor Tim Kaine on the ticket. Whereas the national popular vote swung 1.77% Republican from the previous election, Virginia swung 1.44% Democratic. (Due to a higher third-party vote, Clinton's percentage was lower than Obama's in both 2008 and 2012, however.) Kaine himself became optimistic on election night after it became clear that he and Clinton would win Virginia by a larger margin than Obama did in 2012. His optimism soon faded, however, as it was announced that Clinton had lost many other important swing states to Trump.

Conversely, Trump became the first Republican since Calvin Coolidge in 1924 to win the White House without carrying Virginia and Clinton the first Democrat to carry the state without winning the presidency since that election.  Trump is also the first Republican since Ronald Reagan in 1980 to win the presidency without sweeping every former confederate state. The Old Dominion had been a traditionally Democratic-leaning state from the party's founding until 1952. It then became reliably Republican-leaning from 1952 until 2004, after which point it has voted Democratic in every presidential election. This was due largely to migration into counties in Northern Virginia, close to Washington, D.C., which has further tilted these densely populated areas towards the Democratic Party.

Virginia was the only one of the eleven states that composed the Confederate States of America to vote Democratic in this election. This is a reversal from 1976, when it was the only state that had been part of the Confederacy to vote Republican. Virginia was also the only state Hillary Clinton won which was never carried by her husband Bill Clinton in either of his runs for president in 1992 and 1996 in which the state ironically had last voted against the winning candidate. Virginia was one of eleven states to vote more Democratic than in 2012.

This was only the third time since Reconstruction that Virginia voted for a different candidate than Florida, after 1976 and 1996, and the first in which Virginia voted Democratic while Florida voted Republican. This would happen again four years later.

Trump became the first Republican to win the White House without carrying Prince William County since Dwight D. Eisenhower in 1952, as well as the first to do so without carrying Loudoun County since Herbert Hoover in 1928, and the first to do so without carrying Henrico County since Coolidge in 1924.

Primaries

Democratic primary

The 108 delegates (95 pledged delegates and 13 super delegates) from Virginia to the Democratic National Convention were allocated in this way. Among the pledged delegates, 62 of them were allocated based on the popular vote in each congressional district. The 33 at-large delegates were then allocated based on the statewide popular vote.

Republican primary

The 49 delegates from Virginia to the Republican National Convention were allocated proportionally based on the popular vote.

Libertarian nomination
The 2016 Libertarian Party presidential ticket was former New Mexico Governor Gary Johnson for president and former Massachusetts Governor Bill Weld for vice president. They earned those nominations at the Libertarian Party 2016 National Convention on Memorial Day weekend.

Green primary
The Virginia Green Party held its primary from March 20 through April 3. Party members were able to vote online through an email ballot or through the mail. On April 13, it was announced that Jill Stein had won with 76% of the vote. The state's four delegates were apportioned at the May 28 state meeting.

General election

Polling

In polling, Hillary Clinton won or tied in every pre-election poll but one. An average of the last three polls showed Clinton ahead of Trump 48% to 43%, which was accurate compared to the results.

Voting history
Virginia joined the Union in June 1788 and has participated in all elections from 1789 onwards, except 1864 and 1868 (due to its secession from the US due to the American Civil War). Since 1900, Virginia voted Democratic 54.17% of the time and Republican 45.83% of the time. From 1968 to 2004, Virginia voted for the Republican Party candidate. Then, in the 2008 and 2012 elections, the state voted for the Democratic Party. The same trend continued in the 2016 presidential elections.

Clinton had several advantages in Virginia. The first was due in part to her landslide win in the Democratic primary against Senator Bernie Sanders. The second was Virginia has a significant number of African American voters, many of whom backed Clinton in the primary and both of President Barack Obama's wins in the state. The third was the state's growing share of well-educated suburban voters, especially in the suburbs surrounding Washington, D.C., who were moving away from the Republican Party in response to Trump being nominated for president. The fourth was Clinton's pick of the state's own US Senator, Tim Kaine, as her vice presidential running mate.

While polls throughout the campaign showed Clinton leading Republican Donald Trump by varying margins in Virginia, it was announced on October 13 that the Trump campaign was pulling its resources out of the state, likely ceding to Clinton what was perceived to be a critical battleground state. According to the Trump campaign, the reason for pulling out of Virginia was to compete in more critical battleground states like Pennsylvania, Florida, North Carolina, and Ohio, all of which were states he won.

Predictions
The following are final 2016 predictions from various organizations for Virginia as of election day.

Results

By city/county

Counties and independent cities that flipped from Democratic to Republican 
Buckingham (largest town: Dillwyn)
Caroline (largest town: Bowling Green)
Chesapeake (independent  city)
Covington (independent  city)
Essex (largest town: Tappahannock)
Nelson (largest community: Nellysford)
Westmoreland (largest town: Colonial Beach)

Counties and independent cities that flipped from Republican to Democratic
Montgomery (largest town: Blacksburg)

By congressional district
Trump won 6 of 11 congressional districts, while Clinton won 5, including one held by a Republican.

See also
Democratic Party of Virginia
Republican Party of Virginia
Libertarian Party of Virginia
Green Party of Virginia

Notes

References

External links
 RNC 2016 Republican Nominating Process 
 Green papers for 2016 primaries, caucuses, and conventions
 Decision Desk Headquarter Results for Virginia

VA
2016
Presidential